Gymnastics is one of the sports at the quadrennial Commonwealth Games.

Artistic gymnastics was a core discipline of the Commonwealth Games between 2002 to 2022 and was required by the Commonwealth Games Federation to be included in each games' sporting program. It was first held as a demonstration sport in 1974 before being included in the main programme in 1978. It has appeared at every games since 1990.

Rhythmic gymnastics is an optional discipline and may, or may not, be included in the sporting program of each edition of the Games. It has been included in every edition since its 1994 debut, except the 2002 Games.

Editions

All-time medal table
''Updated after the 2022 Commonwealth Games

Most successful Commonwealth Games gymnasts

The most successful gymnast in Commonwealth Games history is the Canadian rhythmic gymnast Alexandra Orlando. She is also the only gymnast to have won a clean sweep of every gold in her discipline - artistic or rhythmic - in a single Games since the introduction of individual apparatus to the Games. 

The following gymnasts have won 4 or more gold medals at the Commonwealth Games:

Best results by event and nation

Australia is the only nation to have won a gold in every event currently in the gymnastics program; only in the rhythmic gymnastics discipline of Rope have they failed to do so, and the discipline was discontinued in 1994. Of the other two dominant nations in Commonwealth gymnastics, Canada have won gold in all rhythmic disciplines including rope, but no higher than silver on pommel horse, and England  have won gold in all artistic gymnastic disciplines but only one gold in rhythmic gymnastics. Traditionally Scotland and Cyprus have been successful in artistic gymnastics, while Malaysia and Wales have found medals in rhythmic gymnastics.

References

External links
Commonwealth Games sport index

 
Sports at the Commonwealth Games
Commonwealth Games